Sleepwalk-driving, or more commonly known as sleep-driving, is a rare phenomenon where the person drives a motor vehicle while they are sleepwalking. If stopped by police, sleepwalk-drivers are totally incapable of having any interaction with the police, if they are still sleepwalking during the event. Sleepwalk-driving can occur to people who normally don't experience sleepwalking, since some medications, especially Ambien and Lunesta, can cause sleepwalking as unwanted side effect.

Cases
There has been a case, where a person driving a car, ended up in fatal accident, running over another person, but claimed that he was sleepwalk-driving while the scenario took place.

References

Driving
Sleepwalking